Pui de Lleràs is a mountain near the French border in the Province of Lleida in Catalonia, Spain. It has an elevation of 1,691 metres above sea level.

See also
Mountains of Catalonia

References

Mountains of Catalonia
One-thousanders of Spain